Romain Febvre (born 31 December 1991) is a French professional motocross racer. He has competed in the FIM Motocross World Championships since 2011. Febvre is notable for winning the 2015 FIM Motocross World Championship in the MXGP class for motorcycles displacing 450cc.

Motocross career
Born in Epinal, France, Febvre competed in motocross and supermoto as a youth, winning the 2007 French 125cc Supermoto national championship. In 2011, he won the 2011 European Motocross Championship. He then progressed to the MX2 class of the world championship with his best result being a third-place finish in the 2014 MX2 championship while riding for the Wilvo Nestaan Husqvarna Factory Racing team.

Febvre was then contracted to ride in the premier MXGP class for the Yamaha factory racing team run by 1984 world champion Michele Rinaldi. He went on to clinch the 2015 FIM Motocross World Championship title with thirteen moto wins.

Febvre was also a member of the French team that scored three consecutive victories at the Motocross des Nations event in 2015, 2016 and 2017.

Febvre left Yamaha at the end of 2019 and signed on with Kawasaki, whom he continues to race for to this day.

References 

Living people
1991 births
Sportspeople from Épinal
French motocross riders
21st-century French people